Lipinki  is a village in Gorlice County, Lesser Poland Voivodeship, in southern Poland. It is the seat of the gmina (administrative district) called Gmina Lipinki.

The village has a population of 2,400.

History
As a result of the first of Partitions of Poland (Treaty of St-Petersburg dated 5 July 1772, the Galicia area was attributed to the Habsburg Monarchy. For more details, see the article Kingdom of Galicia and Lodomeria.

A postoffice was opened in 1890, under the Bezirkshauptmannschaft Gorlice.

References

Villages in Gorlice County